The following is a list of phrases from sports that have become idioms (slang or otherwise) in English. They have evolved usages and meanings independent of sports and are often used by those with little knowledge of these games.

The sport from which each phrase originates has been included immediately after the phrase. In some cases, the specific sport may not be known; these entries may be followed by the generic term sports, or a slightly more specific term, such as team sports (referring to such games as baseball, football, hockey, etc.), ball sports (baseball, tennis, volleyball, etc.), etc.

This list does not include idioms derived exclusively from baseball. The body of idioms derived from that sport is so extensive that two other articles are exclusively dedicated to them. See English language idioms derived from baseball and baseball metaphors for sex.

Examination of the ethnocultural relevance of these idioms in English speech in areas such as news and political discourse (and how "Rituals, traditions, customs are very closely connected with language and form part and parcel of the linguacultural “realia”") occurs. The occurrence is of note for philologists, linguists. Phrases from sports are a "part of a nation’s linguoculture." where "members of common culture not only share the same information but also the methods of coding, storing and retrieving the information.

B

beat someone to the punch

Boxing: to anticipate and potentially react to a move or action.

block and tackle
 American football, rugby, etc: The basics, to get back to the basics. When referenced, it's usually speaking to changing the behavior or going back to an earlier time when things were functional or building basic skills to ensure the success of various endeavors. In some ball games (for example American or Canadian football, rugby, etc.), blocking and tackling are basic components of the game. In order to be successful in the game, a player must understand when to block and when to tackle.  (Not the block and tackle system of cables and pulleys for lifting heavy loads.)

C
call an audible American football: To improvise; often in the spur of the moment. The term is based on the practice of changing a play right before the play is run in American football.
carry the ball
 American football, rugby, etc: To take charge, to assume responsibility. In some ball games (for example American or Canadian football, rugby, etc.), the ball can be carried to advance toward a goal. ADHI dates figurative usage the "early 1900s". Compare drop the ball, below.
come out fighting or come out swinging  Boxing: To go immediately on the offensive, often pre-emptively; or, to strongly defend oneself or one's beliefs. CIDI,

D
down and out  Boxing: Lacking money or prospects; penniless or destitute. A boxer who is "down" has been knocked to the canvas, and one who is also "out" is unconscious or unable to resume the fight; thus a down-and-out boxer is utterly defeated. AHDI states the term "probably" came from boxing, circa 1900; OED references boxing rather obliquely, and cites first figurative usage to 1889.
down for the count; out for the count  Boxing: To be defeated. Refers to a boxer being knocked down; the referee will count off ten seconds, the time allotted for the boxer to regain his feet or lose the fight. Down for the count may imply a temporary setback, as down does not necessarily imply out. AHDI dates "down for the count" to the 1920s;  OED cites out for the count to 1930. Compare take the full count, below.
down to the wire  Horse racing: To the very end or last minute. From the length of wire stretched across a racetrack at the finish line. AHDI dates its figurative use to about 1900.
drop the ball  Baseball, rugby, American football, etc: To make an error, to miss an opportunity. In games where a ball may be legally caught (e.g. baseball) or carried (e.g. American football), a player (or the player's team) may be penalized for dropping the ball; for example, an American football player who drops a ball ("fumbles") risks having the ball recovered and carried by the other team; in baseball, a player who drops a thrown or batted ball may be charged with an error. AHDI dates the figurative usage to about the 1950s. Compare carry the ball, above.
drop the gloves  Ice hockey: To engage in a fight, whether figurative or literal.  Refers to the act of hockey players throwing off their gloves to punch with bare knuckles.

E
end around American football: An evasive tactic; an attempt to avoid or bypass opposition. In America football, it is an attempt to run around one's own end (of a line of players) and towards the goal. OED dates football usage to 1902, figurative to  1952.

F
flood the zone
American Football: Filling a region on the field of play with the intention of overwhelming the defense

full-court press  Basketball: An all-out effort to exert pressure. In basketball, full-court press is an aggressive defence strategy in which the defenders put pressure on the opposing team over the entire court, trying to disrupt their dribbling and passing. It was widely used in this sense beginning in the late 1940s. AHDI cites the figurative usage to the "late 1900s". OED cites first basketball usage in 1976, and figurative usage in 1978, but the cite itself states that the term was used figuratively in "the late sixties".

G
gambit  Boxing: A strategem or tactic; chess: an opening system that involves a pawn sacrifice to gain the initiative right from the start. The term arrives in modern parlance through chess, but originates in wrestling from the Italian gambetto, tripping the opponent. OED cites the chess usage to 1656, the figurative usage to 1855.
get the ball rolling  Some ball games: To start an endeavour. Some ball games are started by rolling a ball into play. AHDI dates to the late 18th century. See also keep the ball rolling, below.
glass jaw  Boxing: Vulnerability, especially of a public figure, to destructive criticism.  In boxing, a fighter who is especially vulnerable or susceptible to a knockout is said to have a glass jaw.
the gloves are off  Boxing, Hockey: See take off the gloves, below.
go the distance  Boxing: Carry through a course of action to completion. A boxer goes the distance when he can fight through all the scheduled rounds. OED cites the boxing idiom to 1934, but does not date its figurative usage.
go for an early bath Association football, Rugby  When a player is sent off for a serious foul or dismissable offence.  The player therefore returns to the changing room and has an early bath or shower before the rest of the team.  The phrase is sometimes modified to "go for an early shower".
go to the mat  Wrestling: to engage in an argument or dispute, especially until one side is victorious. In wrestling, it means to engage in a wrestling bout, the mat being the surface on which the contest is fought. OED cites the wrestling usage to 1908, the figurative to 1912; however, AHDI states it has been used in its figurative sense "since about 1900".
move the goalposts  Association football: to change plans or rules, thus making it difficult for others to achieve something.

H
hands down  Horse racing: With great ease; unconditionally; often (and originally) in the phrase to win hands down, in which a jockey, certain of victory, drops his hands relaxes his hold on the reins. The horse-racing phrase is first cited by OED in 1867, figurative usage in 1913.
Hail Mary  American football: A long shot, a desperate last-ditch attempt, as if relying on a prayer, the (Catholic) "Hail Mary" (Ave Maria). Usually a long pass into the end zone to win the game.
hat-trick  Cricket: A threefold feat in an endeavour. In cricket, a bowler who took three wickets with three successive bowls was entitled to a new hat (or some other prize) awarded by his club. OED cites to 1877, figurative to 1909. Later used in many other team sports.
have someone in your corner  Boxing: To have the support or help of someone. A boxer's ringside support staff – second, cut man, etc. – are in his corner, and assist him between rounds.
heavy hitter  Boxing: An important or influential individual or organization. Refers to a boxer who is able to hit hard; The ability to end a bout with one swing; AHDI states it "was transferred to other enterprises in the mid-1900s".
heavyweight  Boxing:  A person of great influence or importance. OED dates the boxing usage to 1877, although it was used in newspapers as early as 1849. (It was previously used in horse-racing, and in wrestling as early as 1838). OED does not cite or date the figurative usage. See also lightweight, below.
hit below the belt  Boxing: To act unfairly or unscrupulously, in disregard of the rules. To hit an opponent below the belt is an illegal move in boxing. WNM dates this use to "1941–46"; Theidioms dates to 1891.
home stretch or homestretch  Horse racing: The final phase of an endeavour or project. On a racecourse, the home stretch is the final part of track on which the race finishes. OED dates racing usage to 1841, but does not date or cite a figurative usage; M-W defines a figurative use but does not date it.
hospital pass Rugby: Passing the ball to a player who is already marked and sure to be tackled - implying being put into hospital by the severity of the inevitable tackle.
hurler on the ditch  Hurling: A non-participant who criticises from outside. Derives from a spectator (typically a man too old to play any more) criticising the players whilst observing from an earth bank (a ditch; most hurling clubs do not have stands so the crowd stand at the pitchside).

I
in-fighting, infighting  Boxing: Close-quarter fighting. Also, conflict between members of the same organization, often concealed from outsiders. Infighting in boxing is fighting in close quarters; when the fighters are extremely close, it may sometimes be difficult for spectators (or even the referee) to see each blow. OED dates the boxing usage to 1812, and the first non-boxing meaning to 1928, and the first  non-physical meaning to 1960. OED does not refer to the second meaning, which is the one stated (but undated) by AHD and WordNet.

K
keep one's eye on the ball  Ball games: To remain alert. In most games involving balls, it is important for players to keep track of the ball. AHDI dates to circa 1900.
keep the ball rolling (keep the ball bowling)  Some ball games: To keep a conversation or endeavour from flagging. In some games, the ball must be kept moving or play stops. AHDI dates to the late 18th century; See also get the ball rolling, above.
kisser  The mouth or face. Although the etymology is obvious – that which kisses – it apparently first appeared as boxing slang in 1860 (OED).
knock for six  Cricket To surprise or shock (someone).  In cricket, a "six" results from a ball that is hit in the air and beyond the boundary of the field.  It is the most valuable outcome for a batsman, being worth (as its name suggests) six runs from one delivery.  The bowler who delivered the ball is said to have been "knocked for six".
knockout, knock-out  Boxing: In boxing a "knockout" is scored when one boxer "knocks out" another boxer, either by striking him unconscious, or knocking him to the canvas such that he cannot rise within a count of ten (a "technical knockout"). AHD derives the figurative term from the boxing in the "early 20th century"; OED does not. Both seem to suggest, however, that the verb phrase "knock out" or "knock someone out" predates boxing.
kayo, K.O.  Boxing: To put out of commission. From the boxing phrase "knockout" (knock unconscious), abbreviated "K.O." and pronounced and often written as "kayo". OED dates "K.O." to 1922, figurative use to 1923; "kayo" to 1923, figurative sense 1939. See knockout, below.

L
lead with one's chin  Boxing: To speak without caution, or to leave oneself unprotected. Refers to a boxer leaving his chin, a vulnerable point, unprotected. AHDI dates this usage to the "mid-1900s";  OED cites Erle Stanley Gardner in 1949.
last man out  Baseball: a person who is ignored. Comes from when the team comes in and the last person comes straggling in feeling small and ashamed or disgraceful.
light the lamp  Hockey: to score a goal. Comes from the red light behind the net that goes off when a goal is scored.
lightweight  Boxing:  (A person or thing) of little importance, consequence, intelligence or ability. OED cites boxing usage to 1823, figurative usage to 1885.
low blow  Boxing: An unscrupulous or unfair attack, action, or insult. Refers to an illegal blow aimed at the area below another boxer's waist or belt. Also known as "hitting below the belt". AHDI cites this usage to about 1950. See hit below the belt, above.

M
missed an open goal/net Association football/Hockey: to miss an easy opportunity. Relates to the act of failing to score when there is no-one protecting the goal.
Monday morning quarterback  American football: A person who criticizes or passes judgment with the benefit of hindsight. Monday morning refers to the games played or broadcast on Sunday, with criticisms leveled by commentators the following week. See also hindsight bias and quarterback, below. OED cites football usage to 1932.

N
no holds barred  Wrestling: With all restrictions relaxed. The rules of wrestling bar or proscribe certain holds or grips on one's opponent. OED cites figurative usage to 1942, while AHDI indicates its wrestling origins.
by a nose   see win by a nose, below.

O
on the ball Association football: To be alert and aware of what is going on around you. Relates to the act of being in control of the ball in association football.
on the ropes  Boxing:  On the verge of defeat. Refers to a boxer who has been knocked against the ropes that enclose the boxing ring and kept there by the blows of his opponent. OED cites the boxing usage to 1958, figurative use to 1970.
one-two (punch), the old one-two   Boxing An attack consisting of two punches in rapid succession with alternate hands. OED cites boxing usage to 1811, figurative usage to 1948. The phrase the old one-two is cited in 1960, but quotes it from "a more vulgarly robust age".
out for the count  See down for the count, above.
 out of the park, to hit it out of the park Baseball: To be wildly successful, to exceed expectations.

P
par for the course  Golf: Typical; what is expected. Derived from the literal meaning of par for the course in golf.
Political football  Association football: an issue in politics that is continually debated but is yet to be resolved.
pull one's punches  Boxing: To use less force than one is capable of; to be gentle or lenient. In boxing, a boxer who holds back from using all his strength is said to pull his punches. Often used in a negative sense, in the phrase "pull no punches". The boxing term dates to 1934, the figurative to 1937 (OED).
punch-drunk   Boxing: dazed, bewildered, or confused; or behaving in such a manner. In boxing, it refers to Dementia pugilistica, a neurological disorder in boxers triggered by repeated dazing blows or punches to the head over an extended period of time; symptoms include dementia, inappropriate behaviour, slurring of speech, etc., which resemble symptoms of alcoholic intoxication (hence punch-drunk). Figuratively, it refers to a state of dazedness or confusion resulting from fatigue, overwork, burnout, continuous exposure to unpleasant situations, or perhaps even emotional upheaval, as in suffering repeated figurative blows to one's ego, emotional well-being, etc. OED dates the boxing usage to 1918, the figurative to 1934. See punchy, slap-happy, below..
punchy  Boxing: See punch-drunk, above; also, in a state of nervous tension, fatigued. OED cites as synonym for "punch-drunk" to 1937, alternate meaning to 1943. See punch-drunk, above, slap-happy, below.
punt  American Football: Used to convey that things aren't going as planned and it is time to step back and reassess the situation
push it over the goal line  American Football: Complete the activity or project, finish to job.  Value of work often has little value until its completion.  In American football, a team's drive to move the football down the field doesn't count until the ball crosses the goal line.
put some points on the board American Football: Show some impact or progress in a project. In American Football, teams can spend an inordinate amount of time moving the ball up and down the field without scoring.

Q
quarterback  American football: One who directs or leads; a mastermind; also used as a verb, to quarterback. It is also used as a term for a supporter or critic of a  team or game, and by extension, an uninvolved observer who criticizes or second-guesses; see Monday morning quarterback, above. In American football, the quarterback is the player on the field responsible for coordinating and directing play, and the one to whom the ball is snapped at the beginning of each play. OED cites figurative use of "leader" to 1961; it dates the verb usage to 1952, a cite which in itself cites the term to 1945.

R
ringer  Horse racing: An impostor, especially one who misrepresents his or her identity or ability in order to gain an advantage in a competition. In horse racing, when a fast horse was substituted for a slower one that it resembled (a "ring-in"). The term now applies to any athlete entered in a team competition under false pretenses in order to gain a competitive advantage by strengthening the team. In competitive video gaming this is called smurfing.
ringside judge  Boxing: A person who follows a topic or situation closely. In boxing, the ringside judges who score a boxing match sit at the ringside table (see below), and thus have an excellent view of the proceedings. OED cites this use to 1976.
ringside seat, ringside table  Boxing: A place providing a good view of something. In boxing, a ringside seat is immediately adjacent to the ring in which the boxers fight, as is the ringside table, at which the ringside judges (see above) sit. OED cites ringside seat to 1934, ringside table to 1929.
roll with the punches  Boxing: To take adversity in stride; to adapt to difficult circumstances. A boxer who "rolls with the punches" moves his body away from the force of a blow so as to lessen their impact. OED cites the boxing term to 1941, the figurative to 1956.
round  Boxing: A single phase of an endeavour or contest: "The defence attorney started round two by filing a writ of habeas corpus." Also, an encounter, often confrontational, as in the phrase go a few rounds or go a couple of rounds: "I went a couple of rounds with the ex-wife's lawyer." A round in boxing is one of a set number of short contests (usually three minutes) that make up the entire match. OED dates the boxing term to 1812, extends it to battling animals in 1846, then to a figurative sense in 1937.
run interference  American football: To handle problems for another person or to clear the way for another. In American football, a player who runs interference interferes or obstructs opponents to let the ball carrier advance. AHDI dates the usage to the mid-20th century.

S
saved by the bell   Boxing: to be saved from misfortune or unpleasantness by a timely interruption. Alludes to a boxer who is knocked to the canvas, and must regain his feet before a count of ten or lose the contest; if the bell signalling the end of the round is rung before the count is finished, the fighter now has until the start of the next round to recover and resume fighting. ADHI dates this to the "mid-1900s"; OED cites first boxing use in 1932, figurative use in 1959.
score an own goal  Association football: To do something that has the unintended effect of harming your own interests. Relates to the act of scoring a goal for the opposition in association football, unusually unintentionally.
sideline; on/from the sidelines  Sports: To remove from participation. A player who it is injured, benched, etc. is removed from play and forced to sit on or observe from the sidelines. The sidelines themselves are the lines on the side of the playing field which define the playing area from that of spectators, non-playing team members, etc. OED defines sidelines in terms of "spec[ifically] Football and other sports", figurative use from 1934. See also bench.
slam dunk, slam-dunk  Basketball: A forceful, dramatic move, especially against someone. In basketball, it is a forceful shot in which the player jumps to the basket and slams the ball in. OED only cites the basketball definition, and that to 1976; AHDI cites a figurative usage from "about 1980 on". Figurative usage commonly includes the sense of "can't miss", a sure thing
slap-happy  Boxing: Synonym for punch-drunk, above; also, dizzy with happiness; carefree, casual, thoughtless, irresponsible. The "punch-drunk" meaning OED cites to 1936; the "dizzy" meaning appears two years later. The "carefree…etc" connotation appears in 1937; it appears the evolution of the idiomatic meaning was influenced by the element "happy" over that of "slap".
sparring partner  Boxing: A person with whom one routinely argues or enjoys arguing. Refers to a boxer who is hired to practise with another for training purposes. Other phrases such as "sparring match" (for a verbal argument), and even the verb "to spar" (to bandy words), may actually come from cockfighting.
spike the football  Gridiron Football: To celebrate a victory or win, often excessively. It derives from the American Football practice of enthusiastically throwing or spiking the ball against the ground when a touchdown is scored.
square off  Boxing: To assume a fighting stance or attitude. In boxing, the term derives from the square shape of the ring, and the stance fighters assume immediately before the fight commences. AHD derives the figurative use from boxing in a note at the entry knockout. OED does not specifically refer to boxing, but cites a physical fighting usage to 1838 and a figurative in 1873.
Sticky wicket  Cricket: a metaphor used to describe a difficult circumstance. It originated as a term to describe difficult playing conditions caused by a damp and soft pitch which was rapidly drying.
Stumped  Cricket: To be confused or undecided. In cricket, to be out due to the wicket-keeper disrupting the stumps with the batsman being out of their crease. Batsmen who are out stumped often do not realise immediately what has happened, because they have played at but missed the ball and have their back to the wicket keeper.
sucker punch  Boxing: An unexpected blow. In boxing, a sucker punch is one delivered unexpectedly. OED dates boxing term to 1947, but does not cite first figurative usage.
Sunday punch  Boxing: A destructive blow to an opponent as in "knocked him into next Sunday". In boxing, a Sunday punch is a knockout blow. WordNet refers to it specifically in terms of boxing. OED cites a meaning as a knockout punch to 1929, figurative use to 1944, but does not ascribe it to the sport of boxing directly.

T
take a dive  Boxing: To pretend or feign, with intent to deceive. Refers to boxers who would pretend to be knocked out by a light or even non-existent punch, thus intentionally losing the fight; this was one method of losing a "fixed" fight (one with an unlawfully prearranged outcome, for gambling purposes). OED gives the boxing reference as 1952, the non-boxing in 1982. Also in football
take it on the chin   Boxing: To suffer misfortune or defeat. It alludes to taking a physical blow on the chin; AHDI dates this usage to the "first half of [the] 1900s"; OED, however, qualifies this definition, adding "courageously", and citing its first use to 1928.
take off the gloves  Boxing, ice hockey: To attack earnestly, without mercy. Boxing gloves are worn for protection of the boxer's hands and to lessen the impact of the punches; bare-knuckle boxing is much more savage and dangerous. Used also in ice hockey, as two (or more) players signal their intention to fight by dropping their gloves.  Often used as in the gloves are off, meaning the fight or dispute has escalated (CIDI ). This phrase may derive from earlier forms; the boxing sense OED cites to 1922, the figurative to 1928.
take one's eye off the ball  Ball sports: To lose one's concentration on what is most important. Originates from general sporting advice to look continuously at the ball as it moves.
take the (full) count   Boxing: To be defeated. Refers to a boxer being knocked down, the referee counting off ten seconds, the time allotted for the boxer to regain his feet or lose the fight. A boxer who takes the full count accepts defeat. OED cites this usage in 1902. Compare down for the count, above
throw in the towel  Boxing: To surrender, admit defeat. Originally throw up the sponge or chuck up the sponge; OED cites "from the practice of throwing up the sponge used to cleanse the combatants' faces, at a prize~fight, as a signal that the ‘mill’ is concluded." (1860)  The phrase throw in the towel in a non-boxing sense first dates to 1916 in a book by C. J. Dennis.
throw one's hat into the ring  Boxing: To signify one's candidacy for (political) office or election; to enter a contest. In early days of boxing, one signified a challenge by throwing one's hat into the boxing ring. AHDI cites the boxing use to 1900; OED cites the figurative to 1928.

U
under the wire  Horse racing: At the very last moment; in the nick of time; barely within some accepted parameters or limits. "The report was handed in just under the wire." Or, "At five-foot-five, he was under the wire for the height requirement for enlistment." From the practice of stretching a wire over the finish line at a racetrack. AHDI dates to the first half of the 20th century;  OED dates the horse-racing term to 1889 and the figurative sense to 1929.

W

win by a nose  Horse racing: To succeed by a very narrow margin. "Our bid for the construction contract won by a nose." In horse racing, it describes a win so close that only the nose of the winning horse came in ahead of the other. AHDI dates the sports usage to about 1900, the figurative to sometime after 1950. OED, however, cites a literal usage in 1851, but does not cite a figurative usage until 1997, and that in the phrase "lost by a nose."
work out, work-out, workout  Boxing: To exercise or practice, especially in terms of physical training; also, the act of working out. Work out was a term for boxing for practice as opposed to a set contest.

See also
Glossary of English-language idioms derived from baseball
Baseball metaphors for sex

References
General references:

Specific references:

Sports
Sports idioms
Idioms